Sweetzer may refer to:

 Billy Sweetzer (born 1958), Canadian association football player
 Gordon Sweetzer (born 1957), Canadian association football player
 Jimmy Sweetzer  (born 1960), Canadian association football player

See also

 Sweetser
 Switzer (disambiguation)